Max Edwin Truex ( b. November 4, 1935 Warsaw, Indiana, d. March 24, 1991 Milton, Massachusetts) was an American long distance runner.  He was a two-time Olympian, running the 10,000 metres at the 1956 and 1960 Olympics.  He also was a two-time United States champion in the 6 mile run, the imperial equivalent and added a 3-mile championship in 1962 (though he actually finished second to New Zealander Murray Halberg).

Prep
While running for Warsaw High School, Truex came to fame by setting the national high school record in the mile at 4:20.4, the record that had been held by Louis Zamperini for close to 20 years.  He went to the University of Southern California where he joined the Air Force ROTC.

NCAA
He won the 1957 NCAA Men's Cross Country Championship and on the track set the NCAA 2 mile record.  While at USC he won his first AAU National Championship and the 1956 Olympic Trials.  But the college sophomore went to the Olympics injured and was unable to finish his race.  At the Fresno Relays he added the American record in the 5,000 metres at 14:14.5, setting the 3 mile record at 13:47.6 along the way. Three weeks later in Compton, California he knocked ten seconds off the mark.  That mark still ranks him #2 time on the USC all-time list.  By the time he graduated he was already in the Air Force at the Oxnard Air Force Base, where Olympian Bob Schul and world record holder Eddie Southern were also training.

Olympian
He became part of the Southern California Striders, a dominant track team of this period.  His second national championship in 1959 qualified him to run in the 1959 Pan American Games.

In 1960, he won the Olympic trials, then finished 6th in the Olympics.  In the 1960 Summer Olympics in Rome, Max Truex set the American record in the 10,000 meters, 28:50:2, in finishing sixth in an event long dominated by Europeans.

In 1962, Truex won the national championships in the 3 mile run.  This qualified him to run in the USA-USSR dual meet, the biggest meet of the year.  During that race, he developed a 2-inch blood blister.  He tried to heal it for a year with no success.  He finally retired and returned to USC to get his law degree.

Personal
At the age of 40, he was diagnosed with Parkinson's disease.  The disease deteriorated his quality of life rapidly.  He had to retire early, eventually seeking unconventional fetal brain transplant surgery in China.  He died at the age of 55.

References

1935 births
1991 deaths
American male long-distance runners
Olympic track and field athletes of the United States
Athletes (track and field) at the 1956 Summer Olympics
Athletes (track and field) at the 1960 Summer Olympics
Athletes (track and field) at the 1959 Pan American Games
People from Warsaw, Indiana
Track and field athletes from Indiana
USC Trojans men's track and field athletes
USC Trojans men's cross country runners
Pan American Games track and field athletes for the United States